Alessandra Rosaldo (born Alejandra Sánchez Barrero; September 11, 1971) is a Mexican actress, singer and  dancer. In 2006, she was the winner of the first prize in Televisa Network's, later broadcast in Univision Bailando por un Sueño.

As an actress, she has played main and supporting roles in Mexican TV’s soap operas. She has sold over 4 million records in the Spanish-speaking world as the lead singer of her own pop music band Sentidos Opuestos as well in her solo singer career, for which she received the Lo Nuestro Award for Rock New Artist of the Year at the 16th Lo Nuestro Awards.

Biography

Born Alejandra Sánchez Barrero to Gabriela Barrero and Jaime Sánchez Rosado, she was the first of three sisters, the others being Valeria and Mariana. She studied at the Colegio Alemán Alexander von Humboldt, where she learned fluent German and English, and later went on to finish her high school studies at the American School Foundation, also in Mexico City. Being the daughter of a successful pop music producer she came in contact with Studio musicians and singers since her childhood and at age 12 she began to work with her father as a studio backup Singer. In 2008, she became host of a game show on the Telefutura television network called Dame la Pista. She is married to actor and comedian Eugenio Derbez. She has one daughter with Eugenio Derbez, called Aitana Derbez, who was born in August 2014.

Career

Telenovelas
1999-2000 - Actress in a leading role as Brenda Sakal in the TV production of DKDA, a soap opera produced by Luis de Llano for Televisa, Mexico.

2001 - Guest appearance as La Flower in the TV production of Aventuras en el Tiempo (Adventures through Time), a soap opera produced by Rosi Ocampo for Televisa.

2002 - Actress in a supporting role as Karla Cancino in the TV production of Salomé, a soap opera produced by Juan Osorio for Televisa.

2003-2004 - Actress in a leading role as Paulina Almazan in the TV production Amarte es mi Pecado

2011 - Actress in a supporting role as Julia Mistral in the soap opera Ni Contigo Ni Sin Ti

References

External links 
https://m.imdb.com/name/nm0740946

Living people
Actresses from Mexico City
Singers from Mexico City
Mexican telenovela actresses
1971 births
21st-century Mexican singers
21st-century Mexican women singers
Women in Latin music